Presidential elections were held in South Korea on 19 December 2002. The result was a victory for Roh Moo-Hyun of the ruling Millennium Democratic Party, who defeated Lee Hoi-chang of the Grand National Party by just over half a million votes.

Background 
President Kim Dae-jung's National Congress for New Politics (NCNP) re-branded itself to Millennium Democratic Party (MDP) in 2000, but was struggling as it had defeated by the Grand National Party (GNP) both the 2000 parliamentary election and 2002 gubernatorial elections. GNP's then leader and probable presidential nominee Lee Hoi-chang was polling higher than any MDP candidates.

Primaries

Millennium Democratic Party 
For the first time in South Korean history, the Democratic Party nominated its presidential candidate through open primaries.

At the beginning of the primaries, Rhee In-je, the 3-term congressman who ran against President Kim in 1997 but afterwards joined the ruling party, led the other candidates by a considerable margin in every poll. However, fringe candidate Roh Moo-hyun rose to prominence after winning the Gwangju contest, eventually winning his party's nomination and then the presidential election.

Candidates 

 Roh Moo-hyun, former Member of National Assembly from Busan
 Lee In-je, former Governor of Gyeonggi
 Chung Dong-young, Member of National Assembly from North Jeolla
 Kim Joong-kwon, former Member of National Assembly from North Gyeongsang
 Han Hwa-gap, former Member of National Assembly from South Jeolla
 Yu Jong-geun, Governor of North Jeolla
 Kim Geun-tae, Member of National Assembly from Seoul

Results

Grand National Party

Candidates 

 Lee Hoi-chang, former Prime Minister
 Choi Byung-ryul, Member of the National Assembly from Seoul
 Lee Bu-young, Member of the National Assembly from Seoul
 Lee Sang-hee, former Minister of Science and Technology

Results

Democratic Labor Party 
Labor activist Kwon Young-ghil of the Democratic Labor Party was nominated for president.

Campaign
Although corruption scandals marred the incumbent government, Lee Hoi-chang's campaign suffered from the wave of Anti-American sentiment in Korea generated by the Yangju highway incident. Public opinion of Lee, who was widely seen as being both pro-U.S. and the preferred candidate of the George W. Bush Administration in Washington, D.C., suffered. After losing to Roh by 2% in the December 2002 elections, Lee subsequently announced his retirement from politics.

Roh-Chung coalition 
Chung Mong-joon, the 3-term independent congressman from Ulsan and son of Hyundai founder Chung Ju-yung, became so popular that he began appearing on polls for presidential election after he, as the president of the Korean Football Association, was credited for winning the right to host 2002 FIFA World Cup in Korea.

Chung officially launched his presidential campaign in September, and in many polls beat Roh and came close to beating Lee. Many Democratic politicians that weren't happy with Roh's nomination joined Chung's campaign. However, when it seemed clear that if both Roh and Chung ran, Lee would win easily. The two sides decided to combine forces, instead of competing against each other.

The two sides agreed on conducting two polls, each by different polling companies, where the winner would run as the unified candidate. The winner had to win both polls, or a second round had to occur.

So the two poll was conducted on 24 November, but only one validated. The other one was invalidated, as the two sides had agreed that any poll with Lee Hoi-chang polling less than 30.4% must be invalidated, since there could be a chance that Lee's supporters were attempting to manipulate the results by responding with an untrue answer.

The only poll that was validated was the one conducted by the Research and Research, and it was won by Roh.

Consequently, Chung withdrew his candidacy and endorsed Roh.

However, Chung later broke his pledge on the night before the election, when he felt that Roh broke the promise to include Chung in for policy decisions and surrounded himself only with Democrats. Chung announced less than eight hours before the election that he was withdrawing his support for Roh and urged people to vote their conscience, but Roh won anyway.

Results

By region

Major candidates 
Breakdown of votes by region for candidates with at least 1% of the total votes.

Minor candidates 
Breakdown of votes by region for candidates with less than 1% of the total votes.

References

Presidential elections in South Korea
Presidential election